German submarine U-335 was a Type VIIC U-boat of Nazi Germany's Kriegsmarine during World War II. The submarine was laid down on 3 January 1941 at the Nordseewerke yard at Emden as yard number 207, launched on 15 October and commissioned on 17 December. After training between December 1941 and July 1942, U-335 departed Kiel harbour to conduct a war patrol in the Atlantic Ocean on 30 July 1942. However, after only three days, she was torpedoed and sunk by a British submarine and lost with only one survivor.

Design and description
German Type VIIC submarines were preceded by the shorter Type VIIB submarines. The submarine had two shafts and two  propellers. U-301 could submerge to up to  underwater.

U-301 had a maximum speed of  while surfaced and a maximum speed of  when submerged. U-301 was fitted with five  torpedo tubes (four in the bow and one in the stern), fourteen torpedoes or 26 TMA mines, one  SK C/35 naval gun with 220 rounds, and a  C/30 anti-aircraft gun. The submarine had a complement of between 44 and 60 men.

Construction and career
Ordered on 15 August 1940, U-335 was laid down on 3 January 1941 at the Nordseewerke yard at Emden as yard number 207, launched on 15 October and commissioned on 17 December under the command of Kapitänleutnant Hans-Herman Pilkner.

Between 17 December 1941 and 29 July 1942, U-335 conducted training with the 8th U-boat Flotilla. At the end of her training period, U-335 was assigned to join the 6th U-boat Flotilla, based in St.Nazaire, France. The boat's one and only patrol began with her departure from Kiel on 30 July 1942. Forty-three men died; there was one survivor.

References

Bibliography

External links
 U-boat Archive: "U 335" Interrogation of Sole Survivor 
 

German Type VIIC submarines
U-boats commissioned in 1941
U-boats sunk in 1942
World War II submarines of Germany
World War II shipwrecks in the Norwegian Sea
U-boats sunk by British submarines
1942 ships
Ships built in Emden
Maritime incidents in August 1942
Maritime incidents in August 1943